Thomas Ashford Bogle Jr. (March 7, 1890 – September 21, 1955) was an American football player and coach.  He played as a lineman for the University of Michigan from 1910 to 1911 and served as the head football coach at DePauw University from 1913 to 1914.

Early years
Bogle was born in Ann Arbor, Michigan in 1890.  His father, Thomas A. Bogle Sr., was a law professor at the University of Michigan.

University of Michigan

He attended the University of Michigan, graduating from the Literary Department in 1912.  While attending Michigan, Bogle played as a lineman for Fielding H. Yost's Michigan Wolverines football team from 1910 to 1911.  He also competed for Michigan's track team, receiving varsity letters in track in his sophomore, junior, and senior years.

DePauw
Bogle was hired as the head football coach at DePauw University in Greencastle, Indiana in August 1913. In two years as the head coach at DePauw, he compiled a record of 9–7–1.  In 1913, he led DePauw to a 5–2–1 record and the championship of the Indiana Secondary Schools. In the 1914 season opener, Bogle scheduled a game against his mentor, Fielding Yost. In the days before the game, an Indiana newspaper wrote:"Coach Bogle of DePauw, learned the gridiron game from Hurry Up Yost. Bogle will have a chance to show how much of the game he knows when his team is pitted against the eleven of his former mentor at Ann Arbor Wednesday. Bogle was a lineman at the Wolverine institution."
DePauw lost to Michigan by a score of 58 to 0.

Later years
At the time of the 1920 and 1930 United States Censuses, Bogle was living in Ann Arbor working as a school teacher.

References

External links
 

1890 births
1955 deaths
American football centers
American football guards
American football tackles
DePauw Tigers football coaches
Michigan Wolverines football players
Michigan Wolverines men's track and field athletes
Players of American football from Ann Arbor, Michigan
Coaches of American football from Michigan
Track and field athletes from Michigan